Clifton is a town in and is the county seat of Greenlee County, Arizona, United States, along the San Francisco River. The population of the town was 3,311 at the 2010 census, with a 2018 population estimate of 3,700. It was a place of the Arizona copper mine strike of 1983.

Clifton and Morenci are thought to be an economic area by the Arizona Department of Commerce.

Geography and climate
Clifton is located at  (33.0508966, -109.2961826).

Clifton has a hot semi-arid climate (Köppen BSh) that closely borders on both the hot desert climate and the cool semi-arid climate. There is a large degree of diurnal temperature variation. Summers are very hot and sometimes humid, with most rainfall coming from the monsoon between July and October. The wettest year was 2004 with  including  in August, whilst the driest year with a full record was 1924 with only  including a mere  between July and October. Winters are mild (though with very cold nights) and dry, with snow only recorded in fourteen years since 1892.

Demographics

As of the census of 2000, there were 2,596 people, 919 households, and 685 families residing in the town. The racial makeup of the town was 67.1% White, 1.0 Black or African American, 2.3% Native American, <0.1% Asian, 26.7% from other races, and 2.9% from two or more races.  55.9% of the population were Hispanic or Latino of any race.

There were 919 households, out of which 41.3% had children under the age of 18 living with them, 57.3% were married couples living together, 10.4% had a female householder with no husband present, and 25.4% were non-families. 22.2% of all households were made up of individuals, and 8.2% had someone living alone who was 65 years of age or older.  The average household size was 2.80 and the average family size was 3.27.

In the town, the population was spread out, with 32.3% under the age of 18, 7.7% from 18 to 24, 29.8% from 25 to 44, 19.3% from 45 to 64, and 10.9% who were 65 years of age or older. The median age was 32 years. For every 100 females, there were 109.7 males.  For every 100 females age 18 and over, there were 105.0 males.

The median income for a household in the town was $39,786, and the median income for a family was $41,820. Males had a median income of $39,813 versus $19,485 for females. The per capita income for the town was $15,313.  About 8.1% of families and 11.5% of the population were below the poverty line, including 12.4% of those under age 18 and 10.3% of those age 65 or over.

Government
The town of Clifton operates under a council-manager form of government with seven elected council members, including a mayor and vice-mayor, and a town manager appointed by the council. Each council member is elected to a four-year term. As of 2015, the Mayor was Felix Callicotte and the Town Manager was Ian McGaughey.

Transportation
Clifton is served by U.S. Route 191, Greenlee County Airport, and the Arizona Eastern Railway.

Education
Since the closure of Clifton Unified School District in 2010, it is now in the Morenci Unified School District.

Gallery

See also
 List of historic properties in Clifton, Arizona
 Clifton Townsite Historic District

References

External links
 
 
 Clifton at Western Mining History, includes photo gallery
 Clifton (Historic Main Street Only) – ghosttowns.com

County seats in Arizona
Mining communities in Arizona
Towns in Greenlee County, Arizona
Safford, Arizona micropolitan area
Ghost towns in Arizona